Grindu may refer to:

 Grindu, Ialomița, Romania
 Grindu, Tulcea, Romania